Joe Grech (1954/5 – 21 August 2021) was a Maltese snooker and billiards player. He won the IBSF World Billiards Championship in 1997. He competed in amateur and professional snooker and billiards championships in a career spanning nearly 40 years. He won the Maltese English Billiards Championship on 21 occasions including 13 successive titles from 2003 to 2015.

Life and career
Grech was born in Ħamrun, Malta. He was a professional snooker player for eleven seasons between 1988 and 2000. As an amateur, he won the Maltese Snooker Championship six times and the men's EBSA European Team Championship twice. He represented the St. Joseph Band Club in local competitions.

Rising through the ranks 
Grech competed at the 1978 World Amateur Snooker Championship, which was his first ever appearance in an international snooker competition, subsequently losing to Cliff Wilson in the quarterfinals. He won his first Maltese English Billiards Championship in 1978 by defeating Paul Mifsud in the final by 2307 to 1856 points despite Mifsud having a healthy lead in the first session.

He won his first Malta Snooker Championship in 1980 when he defeated Paul Mifsud in a tight match 7-6. He defended his national title the following year, defeating Albert Mangion 7-1 in the final. However, he lost the next two Malta Snooker Championship finals in 1982 and 1983 to Paul Mifsud. He reached the semifinals at the World Amateur Snooker Championship in 1982 and 1985. He won his third national title at the 1987 Malta Snooker Championship by defeating Alex Borg in the final. It was also his first national title after a gap of six years. He reached his first ever final at the World Amateur Snooker Championship in 1987 but was outplayed by Darren Morgan of Wales. He reached the final of the World Amateur Championship in English Billiards in 1987 but lost to India's Geet Sethi. He became the World Billiards champion in 1997. Despite losing in the final of the 1987 Amateur World Snooker Championship, he managed to register 42 century breaks during the course of the tournament. He was a prominent snooker and English billiards player during the mid-1970s despite being an amateur.

Grech became a professional snooker player in the 1988/89 season. He received generous support from the Zmerc Pub and English snooker player Carm Zerafa who financially assisted him to compete in professional tournaments. He also faced issues regarding travelling from Malta to England as his travelling expenses burdened his performances at professional snooker competitions, especially at the start of his professional career. He competed in professional tournaments occasionally during his first two professional seasons due to the challenges he faced and the circumstances he met with. He reached the round of 16 of the 1989 Dubai Classic but was defeated by Alex Higgins.

Ups and downs 
Grech faced a rough patch for a considerable period of time after failing to deliver expected results in the professional competitions. He subsequently lost professional status in 1990 after a dip in form. He attempted to requalify through the WPBSA Qualifying School but it backfired. Therefore he had to play on the second-class new UK tour the following season, but was invited to the first-class professional Malta Grand Prix. He lost to fellow countryman Tony Drago in the quarterfinals of the 1996 Malta Grand Prix.

After a series of setbacks, Grech emerged as the world champion at the 1997 English Billiards Amateur World Championship after defeating India's Ashok Shandilya in the final by 2895 to 2836 points. In the same year, he reached quarter-finals at the European Snooker Championships. At the 1997 Malta Grand Prix, he lost to Ken Doherty in the quarterfinals. He teamed up with Alex Borg to win the 1997 European Continental Team Cup which was also Malta's first triumph at the European Continental Cup. He won his fourth national title during the 1997 Malta Snooker Championship which was also his first national title after a gap of 10 years. He failed to retain the title at the 1998 championship after losing to Alex Borg in the final.

Grech returned to the first-class professional tour in 1998 but without much success. He reached the semi-finals of the amateur world championship in 1998. He lost to Stephen Hendry in the quarterfinal of the 1998 Malta Grand Prix. He again became national champion for two successive years in 1999 and 2000 at the Malta Snooker Championship. He again collaborated with Alex Borg to win the European Continental Team Cup in 1999 and 2000. In 2004, he reached his thirteenth career final of the Malta Snooker Championship at the age of 50. Grech was a key member of the Maltese team, alongside Alex Borg and Somin Zammitt, which won the 2005 EBSA European Team Championship. He also reached quarter-finals at the 2005 World Billiards Championship after defeating his compatriot Paul Mifsud in last 16 round. At the 2005 Malta Cup, he lost to Tom Ford in the wild card round and was eliminated from the competition. He lost to Mark Allen in the wild card round at the 2006 Malta Cup. He also emerged as the winner of the Snooker Open ranking tournament in 2006 organised by the Malta Billiards and Snooker Association.

He received a wild card entry to participate at the 2007 Malta Cup but was knocked out by David Roe of England. He was an integral player of the team which won the EBSA European Team Championship seniors tournament in 2011. He won the Maltese English Billiards Championship on 13 consecutive attempts from 2003 to 2015.

Honours 
Grech was awarded the Midalja għall-Qadi tar-Repubblika in 1997 after becoming the world champion.

In 2017, Grech was inducted into the Hall of Fame of the Malta Olympic Committee and became only the second billiards player after Paul Mifsud. Grech was awarded the Maltese Sportsman of the Year three times in 1978, 1987 and 1997.

Death 
Grech died on 21 August 2021, aged 66.

References

1950s births
Year of birth uncertain
2021 deaths
Maltese players of English billiards
Maltese snooker players
People from Ħamrun
Recipients of Midalja għall-Qadi tar-Repubblika